Zhabino is a rural locality (a village) in Bereznikovskoye Rural Settlement, Sobinsky District, Vladimir Oblast, Russia. The population was 4 as of 2010.

Geography 
Zhabino is located 33 km southeast of Sobinka (the district's administrative centre) by road. Golovino is the nearest rural locality.

References 

Rural localities in Sobinsky District